Kirinia epimenides  is a butterfly in the family Nymphalidae (Satyrinae). It is found in the East Palearctic in Amur, eastern China, Korea, Ussuri, Japan.

Subspecies
Kirinia epimenides epimenides
Kirinia epimenides atratus Kurentzov, 1941

References

Kirinia
Butterflies described in 1859
Taxa named by Édouard Ménétries